was a district located in Shiga Prefecture. The district is equivalent to the town of Nishiazai in Ika District.

Timeline
1878 Azai District splits into Nishiazai and Higashiazai Districts.
April 1, 1889 Municipal status enforced The villages of Shiotsu and Nagahara were formed.
April 1, 1897 Merged into Ika District.

See also
List of dissolved districts of Japan

Nishiazai District